The Takhti Stadium formerly known by names as Zibandeh and later Saadabad Stadium, is a multi-purpose stadium in Mashhad, Iran. It is currently used mostly for football matches and is the home stadium of Payam Mashhad. The stadium holds 15,000 people. Prior to 2004, it was also the home ground of Aboomoslem.From 2013 it is also  the home ground of Siah Jamegan.

Infrastructure
The complex is composed of two grass fields which hosts football matches and used for training purposes. There are also other sporting facilities such as Swimming Pool which is used by the local swimming team Mojhaye Abi.

Important matches
On 5 February 1985, Takhti Stadium was the venue of an International Friendly between Iran and North Korea. The match finished 1–0 for Iran and Shahin Bayani scored the goal.

The 2001 AK Pipe International Cup was played at this venue, with Abomooslem crowned as champions.

Notable matches
Iran National Football Team

Other Matches

References

Football venues in Iran
Multi-purpose stadiums in Iran
Buildings and structures in Mashhad
Sport in Mashhad